Edward Beach may refer to:

Ed Beach (1929–1996), American basketball player
Edward L. Beach Sr. (1867–1943), U.S. Navy officer, author, and educator
Edward L. Beach Jr. (1918–2002), U.S. Navy submarine officer and author
Eddie Beach (born 2003), Welsh association footballer